Mount Short is a mountain, 2,110 m, standing 1 mile (1.6 km) east of Sculpture Mountain, in the upper Rennick Glacier. Mapped by United States Geological Survey (USGS) from surveys and U.S. Navy air photos, 1960–64. Named by Advisory Committee on Antarctic Names (US-ACAN) for Lieutenant Commander John S. Short, U.S. Navy, LC-130F aircraft commander in Operation Deep Freeze 1967 and 1968.

Mountains of Victoria Land
Pennell Coast